The Ampersand is a high-rise office complex in Calgary, Alberta, Canada. It consists of three identical skyscrapers, designated as North, West and East Tower, and connected by the lobby at ground level and by a shopping gallery at Plus 15 level.

Towers
Sun Life Plaza - West was the first tower built, and was completed in 1981. Development continued with The Ampersand - North, completed in 1982, and was concluded in 1984 with Sun Life Plaza - East. Current occupants include the North West Redwater Partnership and Sproule.

See also
List of tallest buildings in Calgary

References

Buildings and structures in Calgary